Count Giovanni Agusta (1879 – 1927) came from family of Sicilian origin. He formed the Agusta company in 1923 which became part of AgustaWestland. He died in 1927. His son, Count Domenico Agusta, followed in the family business, AgustaWestland. The MV Agusta motorcycle manufacturer began as an offshoot of the Agusta aviation company at the end of the Second World War as a means to save the jobs of employees of the Agusta firm.

In 1907, Agusta designed and built a biplane called the Ag1, and in 1912 he volunteered for the Italian-Turkish War in Libya; in 1913 he was hired by Caproni as an inspector in charge of delivering bombers to the front.

References

Italian engineers
1879 births
1927 deaths
MV Agusta
Agusta
People of Sicilian descent